Hebardacris is a genus of spur-throated grasshoppers in the family Acrididae. There are at least three described species in Hebardacris.

Species
These three species belong to the genus Hebardacris:
 Hebardacris albida (Hebard, 1920) i c g b (Mount Whitney grasshopper)
 Hebardacris excelsa (Rehn, 1907) i c g b
 Hebardacris mono Rehn, 1964 i c g b
Data sources: i = ITIS, c = Catalogue of Life, g = GBIF, b = Bugguide.net

References

Further reading

 
 

Melanoplinae
Articles created by Qbugbot